Alfred James Swift  (25 June 1931 – 13 April 2009) was a South African Olympic athlete and cyclist.

Swift was born in Durban, KwaZulu-Natal, South Africa on 25 June 1931. He was awarded provincial colours for Natal (Kwazulu Natal) and then later for Transvaal (Gauteng). He was awarded his springbok colours in 1952 and competed at two Olympic games, 1952 in Helsinki and 1956 in Melbourne. He also captained the South African Team to the 1960 Summer Olympics in Rome.

He won a silver (4,000m Team Pursuit Men 1952) and bronze medal (1,000m Time Trial Men 1956) at the games. He went to two British Empire & Commonwealth Games, 1954 in Vancouver, Canada, and 1958 in Cardiff, Wales. He won gold (Time Trial) at the 1954 British Empire and Commonwealth Games. He was one of only three athletes (of all types) to win South Africa's highest honour, the Shield of Jove.

He gave back to his sport by serving and being president of South African Cycling Federation and was one of the creators of the Rapport Tour (South Africa's Tour de France). Swift died on 13 April 2009 in Johannesburg, South Africa.

References

1931 births
2009 deaths
Sportspeople from Durban
Olympic medalists in cycling
Olympic silver medalists for South Africa
South African male cyclists
Cyclists at the 1952 Summer Olympics
Cyclists at the 1956 Summer Olympics
Medalists at the 1952 Summer Olympics
Medalists at the 1956 Summer Olympics
Olympic cyclists of South Africa
Cyclists at the 1954 British Empire and Commonwealth Games
Cyclists at the 1958 British Empire and Commonwealth Games
Commonwealth Games gold medallists for South Africa
Olympic bronze medalists for South Africa
Commonwealth Games medallists in cycling
Medallists at the 1954 British Empire and Commonwealth Games